Ruben Imingen (born December 4, 1986 in Fauske) is a former Norwegian football defender.

Imingen started his football career in Steigen SK, and later moved to Fauske/Sprint, before settling at his current club Bodø/Glimt. He was named Player of the Season by the Bodø/Glimt supporter's club Den Gule Horde in 2006, a season which also saw his debut on the Norwegian under-21 national team. On the last home game for the season Imingen took goodbye from football, first he going to take a paternity leave.

Career statistics

References

Profile at Bodo/Glimt club website

1986 births
Living people
People from Fauske
Norwegian footballers
Norway youth international footballers
FK Bodø/Glimt players
Eliteserien players
Norwegian First Division players
Association football defenders
Sportspeople from Nordland